Theoretical and Applied Climatology is a monthly journal published by Springer Science+Business Media which focuses on atmospheric sciences and climatology. It was established in 1949 as Archives for Meteorology, Geophysics and Bioclimatology, Series B and obtained its current name in 1986. It is published by Springer Science+Business Media and the editor-in-chief is Hartmut Graßl. According to the Journal Citation Reports, the journal has a 2020 impact factor of 3.179.

References

External links 
 

Climatology journals
Publications established in 1949
Monthly journals
Springer Science+Business Media academic journals